Lithuania national team might refer to:

 Lithuania national badminton team
 Lithuania national baseball team
 Basketball
 Lithuania men's national basketball team
 Lithuania men's national U-21 basketball team
 Lithuania men's national under-20 basketball team
 Lithuania men's national under-18 and under-19 basketball team
 Lithuania men's national under-16 and under-17 basketball team
 Lithuania women's national basketball team
 Lithuania women's national under-20 basketball team
 Lithuania women's national under-19 basketball team
 Lithuania women's national under-17 basketball team
 Lithuania national beach soccer team
 Lithuania men's national canoe polo team
 Field hockey
 Lithuania men's national field hockey team
 Lithuania women's national field hockey team
 Football
 Lithuania national football team
 Lithuania national under-21 football team
 Lithuania national under-19 football team
 Lithuania national under-18 football team
 Lithuania national under-17 football team
 Lithuania women's  national football team
 Lithuania women's national under-17 football team
 Lithuania national futsal team
 Handball
 Lithuania men's national handball team
 Lithuania women's national handball team
 Ice hockey
 Lithuania men's national ice hockey team
 Lithuania men's national junior ice hockey team
 Lithuania men's national under-18 ice hockey team
 Lithuania women's national ice hockey team
 Lithuania national rugby league team
 Rugby union
 Lithuania national rugby union team
 Lithuania national rugby sevens team
 Lithuania women's national rugby sevens team
 Softball
 Tennis
 Lithuania Davis Cup team
 Lithuania Fed Cup team
 Volleyball
 Lithuania men's national volleyball team
 Lithuania women's national volleyball team
 Lithuania men's national water polo team